It's Great to Be Young is a 1946 film comedy directed by Del Lord, starring Leslie Brooks, Jimmy Lloyd, Jeff Donnell, Bob Haymes, Jack Williams, Jack Fina, Frank Orth, Ann Codee, Pat Yankee, Frank Sully and Milton Delugg. It was released by Columbia Pictures.

Plot
Ricky Malone has a new job at a resort and invites his talented friends, who are mistakenly under the impression that Ricky is entertainment director there. He actually has been hired by Mr. and Mrs. Johnson, the resort's owners, to do manual labor, and demands his friends help him work in the kitchen.

A singer who catches his eye and his ear, Terry, is mysterious about her past and won't tell Ricky why she seems to be running away from something. A detective, Burkett, tails her to the resort. The performers persuade Ambrose Kenton, nephew of Mrs. Johnson, to coax her into letting Milton Delugg's musicians entertain the customers and to let the rest of them demonstrate what they can do.

After they get him drunk, Burkett reveals that Terry's father hired him to bring her back and end her attempt to break into show business. Terry and the others are so talented, however, Mrs. Johnson hires them to remain on stage, and Broadway producers end up interested, too.

Cast
 Leslie Brooks as Terry
 Jimmy Lloyd as Ricky
 Jeff Donnell as Georgia
 Bob Haymes as Spud
 Frank Orth as Mr. Johnson
 Ann Codee as Mrs. Johnson
 Frank Sully as Burkett
 Grady Sutton as Ambrose
 Milton Delugg as himself
 Pat Yankee as Anita

External links 
 

1946 films
American black-and-white films
1946 musical comedy films
Columbia Pictures films
American musical comedy films
Films directed by Del Lord
1940s English-language films
1940s American films